Leopold David Ettlinger (April 20, 1913 – July 4, 1989) was a Warburg Institute historian of the Italian renaissance and UC Berkeley Art Department Chair, from 1970 to 1980.  He wrote some of his books together with his third wife Helen Shahrokh Ettlinger.

He was born in Germany and came to England in 1938 as a refugee from the Nazi regime.  When briefly interned on the Isle of Man he got to know other art historians from the Warburg Institute, which he joined in 1948, staying until 1964. From 1964 he was Durning-Lawrence Professor of the History of Art at London University (replacing Ernst Gombrich).  In 1970 he moved to the US and Berkeley.  He also taught at the University of Reading in England, and Yale.

Helen Ettlinger was born in California and studied at Berkeley.  They later divorced.

Publications
 'The Arts in Western Europe: Northern Europe', in New Cambridge Modern History, vol. 1 The Renaissance 1493–1520, Cambridge University Press, 1957.
The Sistine Chapel before Michelangelo: Religious Imagery and Papal Primacy, Clarendon Press, 1965.
Botticelli, (with Helen S. Ettlinger), Thames and Hudson (World of Art), 1976.
Antonio and Piero Pollaiuolo: Complete Edition with a Critical Catalogue, Phaidon, 1978.

Notes

References
"DAH": Leopold Ettlinger, Dictionary of Art Historians
"UC": Leopold David Ettlinger, History of Art: Berkeley, University of California, In Memoriam.

Academics of the Warburg Institute
University of California, Berkeley College of Letters and Science faculty
1913 births
1989 deaths
20th-century American historians
American male non-fiction writers
20th-century American businesspeople
German art historians
English art historians
American art historians
Historians from California
20th-century American male writers
German emigrants to the United Kingdom
British emigrants to the United States